Abuyazid Ruslanovich Mantsigov (born 28 July 1993 in Vladimir, Vladimir Oblast) is a Russian sport wrestler of Chechen descent, who competes in the men's Greco Roman category and a current world champion in the men's 72kg Greco Roman event. He claimed gold medal in the men's 72 kg event during the 2019 World Wrestling Championships.

References

External links 
 

1993 births
Living people
Russian male sport wrestlers
World Wrestling Championships medalists
European Wrestling Championships medalists
Sportspeople from Vladimir Oblast
20th-century Russian people
21st-century Russian people